William Sherwin (22 May 1763, Derbyshire – 29 March 1822, Parramatta) was an Australian settler.  He arrived in Australia 1792 aboard the "Pitt" as Sergeant in the NSW Corps.  He went on to become a storekeeper and a constable at Parramatta and had significant land holdings.  He cohabited with Mary Duggan (born 1783), who arrived on the "Marquis Cornwallis"  She gave birth to ten children.  William travelled between his farm in Whittlesea, Victoria,  and Sydney.  Members of his family can be found along this route.

William grew the first oranges in Australia.

1763 births
1822 deaths
Settlers of Australia